Amniculibacterium is a Gram-negative, aerobic, non-spore-forming and non-motile genus of bacteria from the family of Flavobacteriaceae with one known species (Amniculibacterium aquaticum). Amniculibacterium aquaticum has been isolated from the Funglin Stream in Taiwan.

References

Flavobacteria
Bacteria genera
Monotypic bacteria genera
Taxa described in 2015